Agrahari Sikh  is a Sikh community found in Eastern India that includes the States of West Bengal, Bihar and Jharkhand.

History 
Agrahari Sikhs have lived for centuries in Bihar and Jharkhand. In the presence of Guru Sahib, Agraharis adopted the Khalsa Panth for protecting their life and religion.

Agrahari Sikhs settled in Sasaram, Gaya in Bihar, Kolkata city of West Bengal, Dumari (Hunterganj), Kedli Chatti (of Jharkhand) and even other places of Bihar and Jharkhand. Agrahari Sikhs moved East of India and are also found in some parts of Uttar Pradesh.

References 

Indian surnames
Social groups of Bihar
Sikh groups and sects
People from Hisar district